Andertons Music Co. (officially L. Anderton (UK) Ltd) is a musical instrument retailer based in Guildford, Surrey, England. Its online store is one of the United Kingdom's top 150 e-commerce sites, with sales approaching $40 million per year. It is widely known among guitarists for video demonstrations by owner Lee "The Captain" Anderton, Rob "Monkey Lord" Chapman, and Peter Honoré a.k.a. "Danish Pete". It also partly owns Chapman Guitars alongside Monkey Lord Ltd, which is in turn owned by Rob Chapman and his wife Natassja Chapman.

History

Andertons Music Co. is a family-owned business founded in 1964 by father and son, Harry and Peter Anderton. Lee Anderton is the son of Peter Anderton.

YouTube
Andertons opened its primary YouTube channel in 2007, originally with the goal of highlighting product sales and featuring product reviews. The channel currently has around 801,000 subscribers (October 2022).

In addition to product reviews and demos, Andertons has featured interviews with many notable guitarists and guitar makers, including Mick Thomson, Joe Bonamassa, Russ Parrish, Paul Gilbert, Guthrie Govan, Albert Lee, John Petrucci, Paul Reed Smith, Mary Spender, Nita Strauss, Walter Trout, Tommy Emmanuel and Steve Vai.

Awards
Andertons has received numerous industry awards, including:
 NAMM 2019: Customer's Choice Award
 NAMM 2018: Dealer of The Year
 NAMM 2018: Best Online Engagement
 Internet Retailing Top 150 Retailer
 NAMM Awards Top 100 Retailer
 NAMM 2017: Best Online Engagement
 YouTube Silver Play Button Award
 Feefo Gold Trusted Service 2017
 2015: Toast of Surrey Awards – Best Large Business
 Best music retailer at the Music Industries Association (MIAs) awards
 MIA Awards: People of the Moment profile: Kris Biddiss

Other interests
Peter Anderton was also the co-founder of the Academy of Contemporary Music.

References

External links
 
 Dreams guitar rendition by Mary Spender and Danish Pete (YouTube)

Music retailers of the United Kingdom
Online retailers of the United Kingdom
English YouTubers
Companies based in Guildford
Retail companies established in 1964
1964 establishments in England
British companies established in 1964
Music YouTubers
English YouTube groups